In theories of quantum gravity, the graviton is the hypothetical quantum of gravity, an elementary particle that mediates the force of gravitational interaction. There is no complete quantum field theory of gravitons due to an outstanding mathematical problem with renormalization in general relativity. In string theory, believed by some to be a consistent theory of quantum gravity, the graviton is a massless state of a fundamental string.

If it exists, the graviton is expected to be massless because the gravitational force has a very long range, and appears to propagate at the speed of light. The graviton must be a spin-2 boson because the source of gravitation is the stress–energy tensor, a second-order tensor (compared with electromagnetism's spin-1 photon, the source of which is the four-current, a first-order tensor). Additionally, it can be shown that any massless spin-2 field would give rise to a force indistinguishable from gravitation, because a massless spin-2 field would couple to the stress–energy tensor in the same way that gravitational interactions do. This result suggests that, if a massless spin-2 particle is discovered, it must be the graviton.

Theory
It is hypothesized that gravitational interactions are mediated by an as yet undiscovered elementary particle, dubbed the graviton. The three other known forces of nature are mediated by elementary particles: electromagnetism by the photon, the strong interaction by gluons, and the weak interaction by the W and Z bosons. All three of these forces appear to be accurately described by the Standard Model of particle physics. In the classical limit, a successful theory of gravitons would reduce to general relativity, which itself reduces to Newton's law of gravitation in the weak-field limit.

History

The term graviton was originally coined in 1934 by Soviet physicists  and F.M. Gal'perin. A mediation of the gravitational interaction by particles was anticipated by Pierre-Simon Laplace. Just like  Newton's anticipation of photons, Laplace's anticipated "gravitons" had a greater speed than c, the speed of gravitons expected in modern theories, and were not connected to quantum mechanics or special relativity, since these theories didn't yet exist during Laplace's lifetime.

Gravitons and renormalization
When describing graviton interactions, the classical theory of Feynman diagrams and semiclassical corrections such as one-loop diagrams behave normally. However, Feynman diagrams with at least two loops lead to ultraviolet divergences. These infinite results cannot be removed because quantized general relativity is not perturbatively renormalizable, unlike quantum electrodynamics and models such as the Yang–Mills theory. Therefore, incalculable answers are found from the perturbation method by which physicists calculate the probability of a particle to emit or absorb gravitons, and the theory loses predictive veracity. Those problems and the complementary approximation framework are grounds to show that a theory more unified than quantized general relativity is required to describe the behavior near the Planck scale.

Comparison with other forces
Like the force carriers of the other forces (see photon, gluon), gravitation plays a role in general relativity, in defining the spacetime in which events take place. In some descriptions energy modifies the "shape" of spacetime itself, and gravity is a result of this shape, an idea which at first glance may appear hard to match with the idea of a force acting between particles. Because the diffeomorphism invariance of the theory does not allow any particular space-time background to be singled out as the "true" space-time background, general relativity is said to be background-independent. In contrast, the Standard Model is not background-independent, with Minkowski space enjoying a special status as the fixed background space-time. A theory of quantum gravity is needed in order to reconcile these differences. Whether this theory should be background-independent is an open question. The answer to this question will determine our understanding of what specific role gravitation plays in the fate of the universe.

Gravitons in speculative theories
String theory predicts the existence of gravitons and their well-defined interactions. A graviton in perturbative string theory is a closed string in a very particular low-energy vibrational state. The scattering of gravitons in string theory can also be computed from the correlation functions in conformal field theory, as dictated by the AdS/CFT correspondence, or from matrix theory.

A feature of gravitons in string theory is that, as closed strings without endpoints, they would not be bound to branes and could move freely between them. If we live on a brane (as hypothesized by brane theories), this "leakage" of gravitons from the brane into higher-dimensional space could explain why gravitation is such a weak force, and gravitons from other branes adjacent to our own could provide a potential explanation for dark matter. However, if gravitons were to move completely freely between branes, this would dilute gravity too much, causing a violation of Newton's inverse-square law. To combat this, Lisa Randall found that a three-brane (such as ours) would have a gravitational pull of its own, preventing gravitons from drifting freely, possibly resulting in the diluted gravity we observe, while roughly maintaining Newton's inverse square law. See brane cosmology.

A theory by Ahmed Farag Ali and Saurya Das adds quantum mechanical corrections (using Bohm trajectories) to general relativistic geodesics. If gravitons are given a small but non-zero mass, it could explain the cosmological constant without need for dark energy and solve the smallness problem. The theory received an Honorable Mention in the 2014 Essay Competition of the Gravity Research Foundation for 
explaining the smallness of cosmological constant. Also the theory received an Honorable Mention in the 2015 Essay Competition of the Gravity Research Foundation for naturally explaining the observed large-scale homogeneity and isotropy of the universe due to the proposed quantum corrections.

Energy and wavelength
While gravitons are presumed to be massless, they would still carry energy, as does any other quantum particle. Photon energy and gluon energy are also carried by massless particles. It is unclear which variables might determine graviton energy, the amount of energy carried by a single graviton.

Alternatively, if gravitons are massive at all, the analysis of gravitational waves yielded a new upper bound on the mass of gravitons. This relation between wavelength and mass-energy is calculated with the Planck–Einstein relation, the same formula that relates electromagnetic wavelength to photon energy. However, if gravitons are the quanta of gravitational waves, then the relation between wavelength and corresponding particle energy is fundamentally different for gravitons than for photons, since the Compton wavelength of the graviton is not equal to the gravitational-wave wavelength. Instead, the lower-bound graviton Compton wavelength is about  times greater than the gravitational wavelength for the GW170104 event, which was ~ 1,700 km. The report did not elaborate on the source of this ratio. It is possible that gravitons are not the quanta of gravitational waves, or that the two phenomena are related in a different way.

Experimental observation
Unambiguous detection of individual gravitons, though not prohibited by any fundamental law, is impossible with any physically reasonable detector. The reason is the extremely low cross section for the interaction of gravitons with matter. For example, a detector with the mass of Jupiter and 100% efficiency, placed in close orbit around a neutron star, would only be expected to observe one graviton every 10 years, even under the most favorable conditions. It would be impossible to discriminate these events from the background of neutrinos, since the dimensions of the required neutrino shield would ensure collapse into a black hole.

LIGO and Virgo collaborations' observations have directly detected gravitational waves. Others have postulated that graviton scattering yields gravitational waves as particle interactions yield coherent states. Although these experiments cannot detect individual gravitons, they might provide information about certain properties of the graviton. For example, if gravitational waves were observed to propagate slower than c (the speed of light in vacuum), that would imply that the graviton has mass (however, gravitational waves must propagate slower than c in a region with non-zero mass density if they are to be detectable). Astronomical observations of the kinematics of galaxies, especially the galaxy rotation problem and modified Newtonian dynamics, might point toward gravitons having non-zero mass.

Difficulties and outstanding issues
Most theories containing gravitons suffer from severe problems. Attempts to extend the Standard Model or other quantum field theories by adding gravitons run into serious theoretical difficulties at energies close to or above the Planck scale. This is because of infinities arising due to quantum effects; technically, gravitation is not renormalizable. Since classical general relativity and quantum mechanics seem to be incompatible at such energies, from a theoretical point of view, this situation is not tenable. One possible solution is to replace particles with strings. String theories are quantum theories of gravity in the sense that they reduce to classical general relativity plus field theory at low energies, but are fully quantum mechanical, contain a graviton, and are thought to be mathematically consistent.

See also

Gravitino
Dual graviton
Gravitoelectromagnetism
Planck mass
Static forces and virtual-particle exchange

References

External links

Bosons
Gauge bosons
Quantum gravity
String theory
Hypothetical elementary particles
Force carriers